St. John's Episcopal Cemetery is a cemetery in Salem, the historic county seat of Salem County.

Noted interments

 Samuel Dick (1740–1812), delegate to the Continental Congress from New Jersey, 1784–1785
 Daniel Garrison (1782–1851), represented New Jersey's 3rd congressional district from 1823–1825; at-large from 1825–1827
 Jacob Hufty (1850-1814), represented New Jersey in the United States House of Representatives from 1809–1814
 Joseph Kille (1790–1865), represented New Jersey in the United States House of Representatives at-large from 1839–1841
 Clement Hall Sinnickson (1834–1919), represented New Jersey's 1st congressional district from March 4, 1875 until March 3, 1879
 Thomas Sinnickson (1744–1817), represented New Jersey in the United States House of Representatives at-large, 1789–1791 and 1797–1799
 Thomas Sinnickson (1786–1873), represented New Jersey in the United States House of Representatives from 1828–1829
 Thomas J. Yorke (1801–1882), represented New Jersey in the United States House of Representatives at-large from 1837–1839 and from 1841–1843

External links
St. John's Episcopal Cemetery interments listed at The Political Graveyard
Find a Grave

Cemeteries in Salem County, New Jersey
Anglican cemeteries in the United States